The Saint Xavier Cougars program is a college football team that represents Saint Xavier University in the Mid-States Football Association, a part of the NAIA.  The team has had 2 head coaches since its first recorded football game in 1993. The current coach is Mike Feminis who first took the position for the 1999 season.

Key

Coaches

Notes

References

Saint Xavier Cougars

Saint Xavier Cougars head football coaches